The Cathedral Folk, also translated as The Cathedral Clergy, is a novel by Nikolai Leskov, a series of "romantic chronicles" (as the author called them) of the fictional town of Stargorod. It is his only full-length novel translated into English. It was first published in 1872 in The Russian Messenger magazine and formed a trilogy with Old Years in Plodomasovo (1869) and A Decayed Family (1874).

Background
Leskov started working on his "romantic chronicles" in January 1866. In 1867, Book 1 appeared in Otechestvennye Zapiski under the original title of Waiting for the Moving of the Water. The Romantic Chronicles. The publication was stopped after a row between Leskov and Andrey Krayevsky over the cuts that had been made. Then Literaturnaya Biblioteka started publishing the novel from the beginning, in its first two issues of 1868 (as Bozhedomy), but then stopped. Only in 1872 did The Russian Messenger publish the full text of a revised version of the novel as The Cathedral Clergy.

In its original version (the one published in Otechestvennye Zapiski), the novel dealt more with the life of Stargorod in general, focusing on its starovery community, but also describing in detail the ordinary, non-religious people's spiritual leanings. Book I looked more like background for the story of Savely Tuberozov, the novel's main character. In the Russian Messenger version, most of the side plots, which had little to do with protopope Tuberozov and his colleagues, have been cut. Konstantin Pizonsky and Platonida, who featured prominently in the chronicles, disappeared from the latter version and resurfaced as the main characters of the short story "Kotin the He-Cow and Platonida," which was included into the collection Novelets and Short Stories by M. Stebnitsky.

Plot
Archpriest (protopope) Savely Tuberozov is a spiritual leader of a Sobor (cathedral) in a provincial town of Stargorod, supported by Father Zakharia Benefaktov and the deacon Akhilla Desnitsyn. He  firmly believes in his spiritual and social mission, and, unwilling to make compromises, comes into conflict with his church seniors, as well as the local authorities. As a young man, he came to Stargorod to combat the Old Believers, but he gave up because he realized that he had to take bribes and denounce the Old Believers to the authorities. At the time the novel opens, Tuberozov is an old man, depressed by his inability to turn the Orthodoxy of the townspeople into an active faith. Tuberozov's main enemies are the corrupt local officials and the atheist schoolteacher Prepotensky. Tuberozov's mission of guiding the townspeople is hardened by the mischiefs of the deacon Akhilla. 

Tuberozov's downfall starts after the government inspector Bornovolokov arrives to Stargorod. Bornovolokov's secretary is Izmail Termosesov, an amoral ex-nihilist, and he wants to build himself a career by any means. Tuberozov makes the speech, accusing the local officials of religious hypocrisy, exploiting peasants and abusing the rural areas. Termosesov denounces Tuberozov to the authorities as a dangerous revolutionary. Tuberozov gets removed from his post, falls ill and dies. Akhilla tries to defend the memory of his teacher, but dies himself in a freak accident. Father Zakharia dies  of natural causes soon afterwards.

Literary significance and criticism 

The novel is also notable for the skaz techniques of Tuberozov's diary, for its "vigorous and distinctive style", bookish turn of phrases, Slavonicisms and biblical quotations.

However, some critics, who judge the Russian novel by the criteria of Dostoevskian or Tolstoian novel of ideas, complain about the triviliazation of issues such as the struggle of materialism and religion in The Cathedral Folk and the novel's comic tone. Others dislike the replacement of a "real" traditional well-structured plot of a classic "realist" 19th-century novel and its balanced portraiture with a "series of anecdotes". This is because Leskov tried to write not a traditional novel, but a chronicle, a fictional history of Stargorod, which was intended as a microcosm of the old Russia (Rus'''). The name of Stargorod literally translates as "Old Town", and it symbolic significance is evoked through a series of parallels with early Russian literature and folklore. Tuberozov is modelled on Archpriest Avvakum, Father Zakharia is in the tradition of saints, who believed in non-resistance to evil, while Akhilla is presented as one of the heroes of Russian folk epic, characters and episodes with them may be folklorized. 

Some criticized the novel for crudely one-sided portrayal between belief and doubt and disbelief. But although portraits of the ex-nihilist Termosesov and his employer Bornovolokov are unrelievedly black, all the positive characters of the novel have clear failings (although treated indulgently), and Leskov criticises not only the foreigners and left radicals (nihilists), but also the Russian Orthodox Church for its bureaucratic consistory system and too close relations with the State. Although Leskov considered himself a "friend" of the Church and thought that it can still be revived, the end of the novel is deeply pessimistic, and few years later Leskov will be disappointed in the Church. 

English editions
 The Cathedral Folk, translated by Isabel F. Hapgood, John Lane, 1924.
 The Cathedral Folk, translated by Isabel F. Hapgood, Greenwood Press, 1971.
 The Cathedral Folk, translated by Isabel F. Hapgood, Hyperion Press, 1977.
 The Cathedral Clergy: A Chronicle'', translated by Margaret Winchell, Slavica Publishers, 2010.

Notes

References

External links 
 Соборяне. The original Russian text.

1872 Russian novels
Novels by Nikolai Leskov
Works originally published in The Russian Messenger
Russian political novels
Works originally published in Otechestvennye Zapiski
Novels set in 19th-century Russia
Russian novels adapted into plays
Novels first published in serial form
Works about nihilism